Vreden is a small town in North Rhine-Westphalia, Germany near the Dutch border. The town is located near the river Berkel. The first mentioning of the town is proven for the year 839. In 1252 Vreden obtained city rights.

Demographics

Religion
 90% Christian
 10% other

Culture and sights

Museums
 Hamaland-Museum
 Farmer-Museum
 Silhouette Museum
 Miniature Shoe Museum
 Skulpturenpark Erning
 Heimathaus Noldes
 Berkelkraftwerk
 Biologische Station Zwillbrock

Buildings
 Former castle
 Old townhall
 Foundations of seven older churches under the current day St. Georg church
 Baroque church in Zwillbrock
 Stiftskirche (collegiate church of the former noble convent of Vreden)

Parks
The "Zwillbrocker Venn": The Zwillbrocker Venn, approximately 10 km west of the city centre is part of a large nature reserve with numerous water areas. The Venn is home of Europe's largest black-headed gull breeding area and the world's northernmost flamingo breeding site.
Vreden City Park: Includes the town's Farmer Museum.

Gallery

Coat of arms
In the 13th century, Vreden was enlarged to a city by the archbishop of Cologne and the bishop of Münster, who were the city owners of that time. The Coat-of-Arms shows Petrus (patron of Cologne) and Paulus (patron of Münster) with a key and a sword behind the cross of Cologne and the bar of Münster.

People from Vreden 
 Johannes Röring (born 1959), German politician
 Stefan Decker, computer scientist

References

Towns in North Rhine-Westphalia
Members of the Hanseatic League
Borken (district)